Harlan Wilson may refer to:

 Harlan Wilson (basketball) (1914–1988), American professional basketball player
 D. Harlan Wilson (born 1971), American novelist, short-story writer, critic, playwright and English professor